Aphanius is a genus of pupfishes. Unlike other members of the family which are from the Americas, Aphanius species are native to northern Africa, southwestern Asia (as far east as India) and southern Europe. Several species in the genus have very small distributions and are seriously threatened.

Fossil record
Fossils of Aphanius are found in strata of the Pleistocene of Italy (age range: from 11.608 to 5.332 million years ago.).

Species
The 39 recognized species in this genus are:
 Aphanius almiriensis Kottelat, Barbieri & Stoumboudi, 2007
 Aphanius anatoliae Leidenfrost, 1912 (Lake Tuz toothcarp)
 Aphanius apodus Gervais, 1853
 Aphanius arakensis Teimori, Esmaeili, Gholami, Zarei & Reichenbacher (de), 2012 
 Aphanius asquamatus Sözer, 1942 (scaleless killifish)
 Aphanius baeticus Doadrio, Carmona & Fernández-Delgado, 2002
 †Aphanius crassicaudus  Agassiz 1839
 Aphanius danfordii Boulenger, 1890 (Sultan Sazlığı toothcarp)
 Aphanius darabensis Esmaeili, Teimori, Gholami & Reichenbacher 2014 
 Aphanius dispar Rüppell, 1829
 A. d. dispar Rüppell, 1829 (Arabian toothcarp)
 A. d. richardsoni Boulenger, 1907 (Dead Sea toothcarp)
 Aphanius farsicus Teimori, Esmaeili & Reichenbacher, 2011 (Farsi toothcarp)
 Aphanius fasciatus Valenciennes, 1821 (Mediterranean killifish)
 Aphanius fontinalis Akşiray, 1948 
 Aphanius furcatus Teimori, Esmaeili, Erpenbeck & Reichenbacher, 2014 
 Aphanius ginaonis Holly, 1929
 Aphanius iberus (Valenciennes, 1846) (Spanish toothcarp)
 Aphanius iconii Akşiray, 1948 
 Aphanius isfahanensis Hrbek, Keivany & Coad, 2006
 Aphanius kavirensis Esmaeili, Teimori, Gholami & Reichenbacher, 2014 
 Aphanius maeandricus Akşiray, 1948 
 Aphanius marassantensis Pfleiderer, Geiger & Herder, 2014 (Kızılırmak toothcarp) 
 Aphanius mento Heckel, 1843 (iridescent toothcarp)
 Aphanius meridionalis Akşiray, 1948 
 Aphanius mesopotamicus Coad, 2009 (Mesopotamian toothcarp) 
 Aphanius pluristriatus J. T. Jenkins, 1910
 Aphanius punctatus Heckel, 1847
 Aphanius saldae Akşiray, 1955 
 Aphanius saourensis Blanco, Hrbek & Doadrio, 2006 (Sahara aphanius)
 Aphanius shirini Gholami, Esmaeili, Erpenbeck & Reichenbacher, 2014 
 Aphanius sirhani Villwock, Scholl & Krupp, 1983 (Azraq toothcarp)
 Aphanius sophiae Heckel, 1847
 †Aphanius splendens Kosswig & Sözer, 1945 (Gölçük toothcarp)
 Aphanius stiassnyae Getahun & Lazara, 2001 (Lake Afdera killifish)
 Aphanius sureyanus W. Neu, 1937 (Burdur toothcarp)
 Aphanius transgrediens Ermin, 1946 (Acıgöl toothcarp)
 Aphanius villwocki Hrbek & Wildekamp, 2003 (Sakarya toothcarp)
 Aphanius vladykovi Coad, 1988

References

 
Cyprinodontidae
Freshwater fish genera
Taxa named by Giovanni Domenico Nardo
Taxonomy articles created by Polbot